Charles-Gustave Stoskopf (1907–2004) was a French architect. He designed buildings in Strasbourg, Colmar and Créteil. He won the second Prix de Rome in architecture in 1933.

Early life
Charles-Gustave Stoskopf was born in Strasbourg on 2 September 1907. His father, Gustave Stoskopf, was a polymath: poet, painter, playwright and publisher.

Stoskopf studied architecture at the École régionale d'architecture de Strasbourg in Strasbourg. He graduated from the École nationale supérieure des Beaux-Arts, where his professors included Emmanuel Pontremoli and Jacques Debat-Ponsan.

Career
Stoskopf won the second Prix de Rome in architecture in 1933.

In the aftermath of World War II, Stoskopf began designing new buildings demolished by the war in the villages of Alsace, especially near Colmar, and in the Territoire de Belfort. He redesigned the Place de l'Homme-de-Fer in Strasbourg from 1952 to 1956. Meanwhile, from 1954 to 1970, he designed housing estates like Colmar's ZUP, Créteil's Mont-Mesly, or Strasbourg's Canardière, Esplanade and Quai des Belges. He also designed churches, like the Notre-Dame Cathedral in Créteil in 1976.

Stoskopf authored a novel in 1998.

Death
Stoskopf died in Paris on 22 January 2004.

Works

References

1907 births
2004 deaths
Architects from Strasbourg
École des Beaux-Arts alumni
Architects of cathedrals
20th-century French architects
21st-century French architects
French urban planners
Prix de Rome for architecture
French male novelists
Commandeurs of the Ordre des Arts et des Lettres
20th-century French male writers